Quayle is a surname of Anglo-Celtic origin, specifically English, Irish, Manx and Scottish.

When the name originates from Ireland, the Isle of Man and Scotland, it is an Anglicisation of the Gaelic Mac Phàil (Scottish) Mac Pháil (Irish) Mac Phóil (Irish) "Mac Phaayl" (Manx) meaning "son of Pàil/Páill/Póil/Paayl". These are Gaelic patronymic forms of the personal name Paul. When originating in Ireland, the name is sometimes a variant of the surname Quill. When of English origin, the surname can be derived from the Old French/Middle English quaille, meaning "quail". In this way, the name would be used as a nickname for a timorous or lecherous person – words that describe this species of bird. The name is recorded in the Isle of Man as MacFayle in 1511 and MacQuayle, Quayle in 1540. The name is recorded in England as Quayle in 1327.

People

Acting
Anna Quayle (1932–2019), English actress
Anthony Quayle (1913–1989), English actor and film director of Manx origin
John Quayle (actor) (born 1938), English sitcom actor

Broadcasting and journalism
Don Quayle (1930–2015), American broadcast journalist, first president of NPR
Emma Quayle, Australian sports journalist
James C. Quayle (1921–2000), American newspaper publisher
Matt Quayle, American television producer, co-creator of CNBC's Squawk Box

Politics
Ben Quayle (born 1976), son of Dan Quayle and former U.S. Congressman from Arizona
Dan Quayle (born 1947), 44th Vice President of the United States
Fred Quayle (1936-2018), American politician
Howard Quayle, former Chief Minister of the Isle of Man
John Quayle (politician) (1868–1930), U.S. Congressman
Marilyn Quayle (born 1949), wife of the Vice President, Second Lady of the United States, and author
Martyn Quayle (1959–2016), Manx politician

Sport
Charlie Quayle (born 1907), English footballer (New Brighton, Crystal Palace)
James Quayle (footballer) (born 1890), English footballer who played only one game (Woolwich Arsenal)
Mark Quayle (born 1978), English footballer

Other
Leo Gordon Quayle (1918-2025), International Opera Conductor
David Quayle (1936–2010), British businessman, co-founder of B&Q
Frank J. Quayle (1892–1971), Fire Commissioner of the City of New York
J. Rodney Quayle (1926–2006), British microbial biochemist and Vice Chancellor of University of Bath
Quinton Quayle (born 1955), British diplomat
William Alfred Quayle (1860–1925), American Methodist bishop

Fictional characters 
Quayle, an NPC in the Baldur's Gate series of computer role-playing games
Lydia Rodarte-Quayle, in the final season of AMC's Breaking Bad

See also
Ex parte Quayle
Quail, a variant spelling
Quaile
Quill (surname) – in some cases in Ireland Quayle is a variant of this surname
MacPhail, a surname

References